TKOL RMX 1234567 is a remix album of songs from the album The King of Limbs (2011) by the English rock band Radiohead. It was released on 16 September 2011 in Japan and on 10 October 2011 internationally by XL Recordings.

The album compiles a series of King of Limbs remix singles by electronic artists including Jamie xx, Nathan Fake, Four Tet, Caribou, Modeselektor and SBTRKT. The album and singles were also released as downloads through Radiohead's website. Radiohead said they wanted to allow the music to "mutate" by giving it to other artists to remix. TKOL RMX received mainly positive reviews.

Singles 
On 6 June 2011, Radiohead announced a series of remixes from their eighth album, The King of Limbs, by various artists. The singer, Thom Yorke, said Radiohead wanted to experiment with the music further by giving it to other artists to remix, and liked the idea that it was not "fixed and set in stone". He praised remix culture, and said: "I didn’t just want floor-fillers and all that shit, I just wanted to see how the songs could really branch out and mutate." The drummer, Philip Selway, told BBC 6 Music he felt The King of Limbs was the Radiohead album that lent itself best to remixing. 

The first seven remixes were released as either double or triple A-sides on 12-inch vinyl singles through XL Recordings on Radiohead's Ticker Tape Ltd. imprint label, and are compiled on TKOL RMX 1234567. The eighth single, TKOL RMX8, was finished too late for inclusion on the album and was released as a download. A remix of "Bloom" by Jamie xx, previously released on the TKOL RMX8 single, was released as a vinyl single on 23 January 2012.

Release
TKOL RMX was released as a download on Radiohead's website in MP3 and WAV formats. The retail version was released on 16 September 2011 in Japan and 10 October in other countries. Radiohead celebrated the release with a live event at London's Corsica Studios on 11 October, with DJs including Yorke and contributing remix artists Jamie xx, Caribou, Lone and Illum Sphere. The event was streamed by Boiler Room.

TKOL RMX reached number five on the US Billboard Dance/Electronic Albums chart.

Critical reception

TKOL RMX has an aggregate score of 67 on Metacritic, indicating "generally favourable reviews". AllMusic said it was "fascinating to hear how this current crop of producers ... twists, bends, adjusts, and appropriates the source material". The A.V. Club felt "the best of these remixes excite and innovate in ways their [King of Limbs] counterparts didn't". However, the Guardian wrote that the album "feels less like an album than an info dump" and questioned "the utility in commissioning Four Tet and Caribou to rework songs that already sound a bit like Four Tet and Caribou". Pitchfork found it "listenable but ultimately bloodless".

Track listing

Personnel
Credits adapted from liner notes.

Remix and additional production
 Anstam 
 Dan Snaith 
 Nathan Fake 
 Four Tet 
 Jacques Greene 
 Ryan Hunn 
 Ernestas Kausylas 
 David Kennedy 
 Lone 
 Modeselektor 
 René Pawlowitz 
 Mark Pritchard 
 Jamie Roberts 
 Mike Sadatmousavi 
 SBTRKT 
 Jamie Smith 
 Darren J. Cunningham 

Artwork
 Wildwood
 Twain

Charts

References

Notes

External links
 The King of Limbs online store

2011 remix albums
Radiohead remix albums
XL Recordings remix albums
Intelligent dance music remix albums